Fred (Alfred) Landman (born October 28, 1956) is a Dutch-born Israeli professor of semantics. He teaches at Tel Aviv University has written a number of books about linguistics.

Biography
Fred Landman was born in Holland. He immigrated to Israel in 1993. He was married to London-born linguist Susan Rothstein until her death in 2019. The couple had one daughter and resided in Tel Aviv.

Academic career
Landman is known for his work on progressives, polarity phenomena, groups, and other topics in semantics and pragmatics. He taught at Brown University and Cornell University before moving to Israel.

Published works
 Indefinites and the Type of Sets (2004)
 Events and Plurality: The Jerusalem Lectures (2000)
 Structures for Semantics (1991)
 Towards a Theory of Information. The Status of Partial Objects in Semantics (1986)

References

1956 births
Living people
Brown University faculty
Cornell University faculty
Dutch emigrants to Israel
Dutch Jews
Linguists from Israel
Academic staff of Tel Aviv University
Writers from Amsterdam